Garavi (also Romanized as Garāvī) is a village in Kani Bazar Rural District, Khalifan District, Mahabad County, West Azerbaijan Province, Iran. At the 2006 census, its population was 48, in 8 families.

References 

Populated places in Mahabad County